Rhacophorus hoanglienensis, also known as the Honglien Frog, is a species of frog in the family Rhacophoridae found in Vietnam and possibly China. Its natural habitat is subtropical or tropical moist montane forests.
It is threatened by habitat loss.

References

hoanglienensis
Taxonomy articles created by Polbot
Amphibians described in 2001